Mabel Esmonde Cahill (2 April 1863 – 2 February 1905) was an Irish female tennis player, active in the late 19th century, and was the first foreign woman to win a major tennis tournament when she won the 1891 US National Championships.

Early life and family

Mabel Cahill was born on 2 April 1863 in the family home of Ballyragget House, Ballyragget, County Kilkenny, the twelfth child of thirteen. She had 5 sisters and 7 brothers. Being part of this society resulted in having social events held by the upper class. In this case, tennis parties. During this time, it was quite uncommon for women to obtain a secondary level school degree however it has been recorded that Mabel attended Roscrea School with two of her brothers, a fee paying school. There is strong evidence to suggest that Mabel and two of her sisters enrolled in Sacred Heart Convent Secondary School.

After school, Mabel moved from her family town of Ballyraggett to the city of Dublin in the year of 1886. where she joined a lawn tennis club which  sparked her love for the sport. Three years after moving to Dublin, Mabel decided to emigrate to America. She boarded the SS Arizona in Liverpool, and she took up residency in New York City at the age of 29.

Career
Cahill won the Orange Club ladies championship in 1890 and 1891. Cahill became the first foreign woman to win a major tournament when she defeated Ellen Roosevelt in the 1891 US Championships women's final at the Philadelphia Cricket Club. She also won the Mixed Doubles event alongside M.R. Wright, though at the time this was not listed as an official event. She successfully defended her women's singles title in 1892 and also won the women's doubles title with Adeline McKinlay and the mixed doubles title with Clarence Hobart. She did not defend her titles in 1893.

Cahill also won multiple titles at other tournaments including the Middle States Championships ladies singles title four times consecutivley (1890–1893), the New Jersey State Championships (1890) held at South Orange, NJ, the Kilkenny County and City Tournament (1884, 1886) held at Kilkenny, Ireland

Grand Slam finals

Singles (2 titles)

Doubles (2 titles)

Mixed doubles (1 title)

Later life and death 
Cahill also attempted to start a career as a writer during her time in America. She wrote a romantic novel called Her Playthings: Men which was published in 1891 but it was not successful. Her short stories  Carved in marble and Purple Sparkling were not well received. In 1893 she contributed two articles to the Ladies' Home Journal, The art of playing good tennis and Arranging a tennis tournament. She  performed as a chorus girl in music halls. Her later years were troubled, and she died on 2 February 1905 at the Ormskirk Union Workhouse. She was buried in Ormskirk on 6 February.

After her death in 1936, the Irish Lawn Tennis Association placed an advertisement in the national press asking that a representative of hers come forward to collect a gold medallion struck to honour her achievements in tennis in America. It is not known if the medallion was collected. In 1976, Cahill was inducted into the International Tennis Hall of Fame, where she is the only Irish representative.

References

External links 
 

1863 births
19th-century female tennis players
19th-century Irish people
British female tennis players
Irish female tennis players
Sportspeople from County Kilkenny
International Tennis Hall of Fame inductees
United States National champions (tennis)
1905 deaths
Grand Slam (tennis) champions in women's singles
Grand Slam (tennis) champions in women's doubles
Grand Slam (tennis) champions in mixed doubles